According to the Kallikratis Programme, since 1 January 2011 Greece, with an amendment in 2019, is divided into 332 municipalities, grouped into the 13 regions of Greece.

References

External links 
 Draft of law for Kallikratis-Law 2010-05-21
 Greek law publication Nr. 1292 from 11 August 2010 (PDF, 555 KB)

2011 in Greece
2011-related lists
 
Greece geography-related lists